The Association for Defence of National Rights Movement Party (abbreviated MHHP) is a political party in Turkey.

See also 

 List of political parties in Turkey

References 

2006 establishments in Turkey
Political parties established in 2006